Bargh Shiraz Futsal Club is an Iranian futsal club based in Shiraz.

Season-by-season 
The table below chronicles the achievements of the club in various competitions.

Honors 
National:
 Iran Futsal's 2nd Division
 Champions (1): 2012
 Shiraz Province League
 Champions (1): 2009-10

Current squad 2012

See also 
 Bargh Shiraz Football Club

References

External links 
 

Futsal clubs in Iran
Sport in Shiraz
2008 establishments in Iran
2015 disestablishments in Iran
Futsal clubs established in 2008
Sports clubs disestablished in 2015
Defunct futsal clubs in Iran